Oxford International School may refer to:
Oxford International School (Panama)
Oxford International School Bishkek, Bishkek, Kyrgyzstan
Oxford International School, Kandivali, Kandivali, Maharashtra, India
Oxford International School, Gulshan Thana, Dhaka, Bangladesh
Oxford International School, Dhanmondi Thana, Dhaka, Bangladesh